Bonsai is the art of growing small trees and plants.

Bonsai 
Bonsai Kitten, an internet hoax promoting the "art" of shaping animals' bodies
Bonsai (2011 film), a 2011 Chilean film
Bonsai (2018 film), a 2018 Indian film

Bonzai may also refer to:
 Colloquial name of Synthetic cannabis
 Bonzai Records, a Belgium-based record label
 Peter Bondra (born 1968), hockey player whose nickname is "Bonzai"
 Jean de Bonsi (1554–1621)
 Cassia "Bonzai" O'Reilly, Irish singer-songwriter

See also
 Banzai (disambiguation)